Harqin Zuoyi Mongol Autonomous County, commonly abbreviated as Kazuo County, is a Mongolian autonomous county in the west of Liaoning province, China. Formerly known as Harqin Left Banner.

Administrative divisions
There are 11 towns and 11 townships in the county.

Climate

See also
Kharchin Mongols

References

External links
 Government website

County-level divisions of Liaoning
Chaoyang, Liaoning
Mongol autonomous counties